The 2012–13 Coupe de la Ligue was the 19th edition of the French league cup competition. The competition was organized by the Ligue de Football Professionnel and is open to the 44 professional clubs in France that are managed by the organization. The defending champions were Marseille, who defeated Lyon 1–0 in the 2011–12 edition of the final.  

The final was contested on 20 April 2013 at the Stade de France in Saint-Denis. The winner of the competition qualified for the 2013–14 UEFA Europa League and be inserted into the third qualifying round.

Calendar

First round 
The draw for the opening round of the 2012–13 edition of the Coupe de la Ligue was held on 11 July 2012. The first round featured 24 clubs; the four professional clubs in the Championnat National, the third division of French football, and the 20 clubs in Ligue 2. The matches were played on 7 August 2012.

Second round 
The draw for the second round of the 2012–13 edition of the Coupe de la Ligue was held on 11 July 2012. The round featured the 12 winners of the first round matches. The matches were contested on 28 August 2012.

Third round 

The draw for the third round of the 2012–13 edition of the Coupe de la Ligue was held on 29 August 2012. The round featured the six winners of the second round matches and the 14 Ligue 1 clubs that did not qualify for European competition in the 2011–12 season. The matches were contested on 25–26 September 2012.

Round of 16 

The draw for the Round of 16 of the 2012–13 edition of the Coupe de la Ligue was held on 26 September 2012 following the conclusion of the third round matches. The round featured the ten winners of the third round matches and the six Ligue 1 clubs that qualify for European competition in the 2011–12 season. The matches were contested on 30–31 October and 7 November 2012.

Quarter-finals 

The draw for the quarterfinals of the 2012–13 edition of the Coupe de la Ligue was held on 31 October 2012 following the conclusion of the Round of 16 matches. The round featured the eight winners of the Round of 16 matches and were contested on 27–29 November 2012.

Semi-finals 

The draw for the semifinals of the 2012–13 edition of the Coupe de la Ligue was held on 29 November 2012 following the conclusion of the quarter-final matches. The round features the 4 winners of the quarterfinal matches and will be contested on 15 January 2013.

Final

See also 
 2012–13 Ligue 1
 2012–13 Ligue 2
 2012–13 Championnat National

References

External links 
 Official site  

Coupe de la Ligue seasons
France
League Cup